Glenn Wilkinson (born 23 April 1970) is a New Zealand cricketer. He played in one first-class match for Wellington in 1996/97.

See also
 List of Wellington representative cricketers

References

External links
 

1970 births
Living people
New Zealand cricketers
Wellington cricketers
Cricketers from Wellington City